Abbruzzi is a surname of Italian origin. People with this surname include:
 Lou Abbruzzi (1917–1982), American football running back
 Pat Abbruzzi (1932–1998), American football running back and coach; brother of Lou

Italian-language surnames
Toponymic surnames